Creobroter gemmatus, common name jeweled flower mantis, is a species of praying mantis native to Asia.

Description
Males grow to about 1.5 inches (3.8 cm) and females are slightly larger.  They prefer a humid environment and live about nine months in captivity. Females can be cannibalistic but males are fairly communal. Though infrequent, cannibalism among C. germmatus is nevertheless more common than among other flower mantises.

They moult 8 times to become an adult and can take between 2 and 5 months to mature depending on food and temperature. They are the smallest yet most widespread Creobroter species.

See also
Flower Mantis
List of mantis genera and species

References

G
Mantodea of Asia
Insects of India
Insects described in 1813